The Litz is a river of Vorarlberg, Austria.

Another part of the water comes from the lake , which seeps subterraneously into the Litz.

In the course of time the Litz created the valley  in a slightly bellied river course. The Gaflunerbach comes from the valley  and discharges into the Litz from the right. The Litz passes Silbertal, traverses the area of Bartholomäberg and of Schruns, where it finally discharges into the Ill.

References

Rivers of Vorarlberg
Verwall Alps
Rivers of Austria